The Ligier JS21 was a Formula One racing car manufactured and raced by Ligier during the 1983 Formula One season.  Powered by a Cosworth V8 engine while the majority of teams used turbo power, the team failed to score any points.

Development
The JS21 was designed by Claude Galopin under the technical direction of Michel Beaujon. Henri Durand worked on the car's aerodynamics. Having used Talbot engines for the previous two seasons, the JS21 was designed to be powered by a Ford Cosworth DFV. Ligier was the first choice to be the recipient of the then-new Honda turbo engine due to team owner Guy Ligier's longstanding relationship with Honda but the team declined to use it. The first three JS21 chassis were converted from the previous year's JS19, with four in total being built.

Racing history
The Ligier team recruited two new drivers for the 1983 season, Jean-Pierre Jarier, who had a single outing for the team back in 1977, and Brazilian novice Raul Boesel. Jarier qualified for every race with a best grid placing of 9th, at the Monaco Grand Prix. His best finish was 7th in Austria. For most of the season, Boesel usually qualified several places behind Jarier but improved towards the season's end although he did miss qualifying for the Austrian and Italian races. His best qualifying was 17th, in the season opening Brazilian Grand Prix, and he achieved his best finish of 7th the following race in the United States.

1983 was the first season in the team's history that it failed to score a single point. For the following year, team owner Guy Ligier secured the use of Renault V6 turbocharged engines.

Complete Formula One World Championship results
(key) (Results in bold indicate pole position; results in italics indicate fastest lap)

Notes

References

Ligier JS21